Vairo is an Italian surname. Notable people with the surname include:

Dominic Vairo (born 1912), American football player
Federico Vairo (1930–2010), Argentine footballer
Juan Vairo (born 1932), Argentine footballer
Lou Vairo (born 1945), American ice hockey coach

Italian-language surnames